The Long Lavender Look (1970) is the twelfth novel in the Travis McGee series by John D. MacDonald. After the preceding book, Dress Her in Indigo, which was largely set in Mexico, The Long Lavender Look not only returns to McGee's usual haunt of Florida, but is almost entirely set in one tiny town deep in the rural part of the state.

The plot begins when McGee and Meyer are driving late at night down a deserted Florida highway, when a young woman, barefoot and clad only in a nightgown, dashes across the road just in front of the car. McGee swerves and just barely misses her, but his car is thrown into ten feet of swamp water. Soon after and to their surprise, McGee and Meyer find themselves arrested, and McGee charged with murder.

References
 
 

1970 American novels
Travis McGee (novel series)
Novels set in Florida